The Choa Chu Kang Columbarium is located within the Choa Chu Kang Cemetery Complex, in Singapore and operated by the National Environment Agency. It houses some 147,000 niches spread over 18 four-storey blocks. It was designed to be a place of peace for the departed and solace for those who visit to pay respect to their deceased loved ones.

It is one of two government operated columbaria in Singapore along with Mandai Crematorium and Columbarium.

References

External links
Cpgcorp website
NEA website
Government-Managed Columbaria

Columbaria in Singapore
Western Water Catchment
Death in Singapore